Wayne Lambkin (born 12 September 1972) is an Australian former professional rugby league footballer who played in the 1980s. He played for Western Suburbs in the NSWRL competition. Since retirement, Lambkin has coached numerous lower grade sides in the NSWRL and NSW Cup competitions.

Playing career
Lambkin made his first grade debut for Western Suburbs in round 1 of the 1987 NSWRL season against Penrith at Penrith Stadium. Lambkin played two seasons with the struggling club as they finished both years with the Wooden Spoon.

Coaching career
Lambkin coached the North Sydney NSW Cup side from 2006-2015 and guided them to the 2007 NSW Cup Grand Final along with several other finals appearances. In 2017, Lambkin guided Manly to the NRL Under-20s title where they defeated Parramatta in the grand final. Between 2019-2021, Lambkin was head coach of the Wests Tigers Jersey Flegg team and was later promoted as Western Suburbs NSW Cup head coach for 2022.

References

1972 births
Western Suburbs Magpies players
Australian rugby league players
Rugby league second-rows
Living people